Twenty Four Seven is the second album by aussie rock band Dallas Crane, released in October 2000.

Track listing
 Sit On My Knee - 2:44
 Sweet FA
 Sold Me
 Already Gone
 Naked
 Lay Down
 Shit Creek
 Nowhere
 Some Days
 Come Again
 Home

2000 albums
Dallas Crane albums